A. excelsa may refer to:

Acropolitis excelsa, a moth of the family Tortricidae
Araucaria excelsa, commonly known as the Norfolk Island pine, a tree species in the family Araucariaceae
Alphitonia excelsa, commonly known as the red ash or soap tree, a species of tree in the family Rhamnaceae
Amanita excelsa, a fungus
Autographa excelsa, a moth of the family Noctuidae